Mangifera quadrifida is a species of plant in the family Anacardiaceae. It is a tree native to Peninsular Malaysia, Sumatra and Borneo.

References

quadrifida
Flora of Malaya
Flora of Sumatra
Flora of Borneo